St. Joan of Arc Catholic Academy, formerly known as Jean Vanier Catholic Secondary School, is a Roman Catholic high school in the Eglinton East neighbourhood of Scarborough in Toronto, Ontario, Canada as a member of the Toronto Catholic District School Board (formerly the Metropolitan Separate School Board). The school building was originally opened in 1965 as Tabor Park Vocational School (1965–1986) by the Scarborough Board of Education, which became the Toronto District School Board who leased the building to the MSSB/TCDSB since 1989.

The school educates 1002 students as of the 2016–17 academic year and it is ranked 331 out of 725 schools in the Fraser Institute report card.

Previously, the school was named after Jean Vanier, the founder of L'Arche in 1964. The school was renamed in July 2020 in honor of Joan of Arc in the aftermath of the posthumous sexual allegations against its former namesake. Its motto is Minds to Reason, Hands to Work, Hearts for God.

History

Jean Vanier Catholic Secondary School (1989–2020)

Long before the existence of Jean Vanier Catholic Secondary School, the first Roman Catholic separate school, St. Maria Goretti Separate School opened its doors in September 1955 and St. Albert in September 1969 as the first schools within the parish of the same name. Between 1959 and 1962, David and Mary Thomson Collegiate Institute and Midland Avenue Collegiate Institute were then established although Midland was the sole secondary school in that area. However, by fall of 1973, Cardinal Newman Catholic Secondary School also opened its doors as the first Catholic high school in that same area as Midland.

The current location, Tabor Park Vocational School was designed by the architects Webb, Zerafa and Menkes, built in 1964 and established by the Scarborough Board of Education in September 1965 as a less academically challenged high school. Its programs were different from Bendale Vocational/Secondary with students integrated to mainstream schooling due to Tabor Park and Bendale were meant for streamed "vocational" high schools for people living near Midland and Thomson. The schools would later forged the model after Tabor Park by the openings of Maplewood and Sir William Osler in 1967 and 1975 respectively. In 1981, the enlarged library and gym storages were built.

By the time Tabor Park closed in 1986 due to low enrolment, Scarborough Centre for Alternative Studies, an adult high school began in this site. As a result of public funding of Catholic high schools, in May 1988, the SBE along with the six public boards to lease the Tabor Park property to the Metropolitan Separate School Board and was reopened and named after Jean Vanier, the Canadian philosopher and founder of L'Arche, to serve the rest of Scarborough. In that case, it was established to relieve overcrowding at Mary Ward, Francis Libermann and Senator O'Connor. By 1988, Scarborough had six anglophone Roman Catholic high schools.

Jean Vanier C.S.S. came to existence on September 5, 1989, within the St. Maria Goretti Parish catchment area as Central Scarborough's with 18 staff and 198 grade 9 students under the leadership of founding principal Michael Leroux, with the first students graduated Vanier in 1993. Construction and renovation began in 1990, and was completed in the spring of 1994, although the eastern portion building was erected and built with 18 classrooms in 1991 along with the front fascia and the school now accommodates close to 1,000 pupils. From the onset, the school was de-streamed in grade 9. The school was opened and blessed on November 13, 1994. In its conception, the school was originally to be named St. Francis Xavier Catholic Secondary School, named after a Jesuit priest, Francis Xavier. But despite a turnout and the elementary school using the name, it was changed to Jean Vanier thereafter.

The school crest was designed by the first art teacher, Martine Girard-Agro in 1989. It features a calligraphy of a "J" and a "V" with a t-like cross.

Following the closure of Midland Collegiate in 2000, Vanier received the remaining students from Midland. To date, students living in the school's former catchment area have applied or attended Vanier since.

In February 2011, Jean Vanier C.S.S. received Dr. Bette M. Stephenson Recognition of Achievement award from EQAO.

Jean Vanier C.S.S. celebrated its 20th Anniversary in June 2010 since it opened in September 1989 with the Mass and Alumni social. The school celebrated its 25th in October 2014 in conjunction with L'Arche's 50th anniversary of its founding.

St. Joan of Arc Catholic Academy (2020-present)
According to an internal report by L'Arche in February 2020, this report concluded that Jean Vanier had engaged in "manipulative and emotionally abusive" sexual relationships with six women in Trosly-Breuil, France, between 1970 and 2005. A Change.org petition set up by a former student called for Jean Vanier's name to be removed and has lobbied the board to do so.

At a school board meeting on July 16, 2020, the TCDSB recommended the name St. Joan of Arc Catholic Academy starting in the 2020–21 school year. The school formally completed its renaming at the end of August 2020. Amidst the COVID-19 pandemic affecting Toronto, the school reopened under its new name the following September with heavy restrictions in place.

The current emblem retains the cross from the previous Vanier insignia now sporting a fleur-de-lis with a sword standing in the centre.

Overview
The enrollment of the school as of 2015–16 is 996 pupils. It is a co-educational semestered school operating in grades 9–12. The school draws crowds from the Bendale, Ionview, Knob Hill, Scarborough Junction, and most parts of Scarborough as well as some from Toronto and as far from Pickering and Ajax. It became a popular destination powerhouse with its excellent facilities and programs since the closure of nearby Midland Avenue Collegiate Institute in June 2000.

Emphasizing on the "AAA" focus, the school has a large athletic field found in most regular public high schools, but usually unavailable with purpose built Catholic high Schools. The design of the former Tabor Park school consists of brown bricks and overall structure in the middle where the quadrangle/courtyard stands. The two catwalks along with 20 new academic classrooms, a seminar work room, and an exercise room was eventually added in 1991 to expand enrollment. as well as black cross was retrofitted in the centre. Other features in the leased 126,241 sq. ft. facility include 28 academic classrooms, two automotive shops, four state-of-the-art science labs, three computer labs, two Mac labs, a visual arts studio, cafetorium, library, expanded ME/DD classroom, a double gymnasia that can be split into two, a drama room, two music rooms, a photography room, guidance area, a recently renovated home economics room and a chapel.

The school's main palette is beige, grey, light blue, blue and white with the lockers colored light blue and royal blue though they were painted aqua green. It has an aforementioned layout in which it is divided into three floors with two separate wings:

The first floor (basement) is a science/computer studies wing in which the old carpentry/automotive/metal shops were renovated over while the greenhouse was removed and on the same floor, which is the English/history/geography wing, it originally had ten academic classrooms until its reduction to seven due to an enlarged room being the ME/DD program.
On the second floor (the main floor), it features two distinctive wings being the mathematics and one exercise room in the new section and at the old 1965 section, it consists of a larger library and computer room formerly split into three shops for textiles, merchandising and assembly), weight room (child care), photography (hairstyling), the CYW office/classroom (assembly and production), drama arts (visual arts), and renovated staff and home economics rooms (food and baking rooms) as well as the chapel, credit recovery room, and the music room that was formerly four classrooms and a library respectively. The gymnasium and cafetorium were renovated.
In the upper level, the third floor, the arts/Com Tech/business wing originally designed with six academic classrooms and presumably four science labs. Currently, it has three classrooms, one ESL room, two computer labs, one Special Education room and one visual arts studio.

In 2011, three portables made their way back to the facility to accommodate more students in the existing campus since the addition was added. All portables were removed from the property in late 2020.

SJA also has a diverse population consisting of South Asians, Filipinos, Whites, Latin Americans, Blacks/African Canadians, Chinese, Arabs, and several other ethnic minorities.

Academics
Since its inception, Jean Vanier offers various courses in the comprehensive academic program for its students. Students can choose from a variety of courses at the academic, applied, and open levels. These, and other specialized courses, help prepare students for university, college, or the world of work after they have completed their studies at the school. Vanier currently offers math, English, science, Canadian History, geography, and religious studies. It also has special education programs.

Vanier, every year, competes in the University of Waterloo mathematics competition.

Arts
The word “Arts” is one that is immensely rich in meaning and its value is greatly appreciated in the school community. The creativity, style, expression, compassion and unique artistic approach is very obvious in 5 Arts Disciplines such as drama, instrumental/vocal music, visual arts, and photography. The drum line was introduced in 2012 by Michael Fanning, a new music teacher at the school.

The combined art, music, technology show called Festival of Sight and Sound started by the arts department in the 1990s consisting of the talents of the music students as well as the work of the Art, Drama and Photography students. It is held in December and May each semester.

On March 6, 2014, Vanier was selected for the MusiCounts Band Aid Grant program costing at $600,000. The school received their $10,000 in equipment for the drum line program such as the marimba and a complete set of cymbals. The guests were Juno Award-winning musicians Classified and David Myles who also performed their single Inner Ninja live in front of 300 students.

Athletics
The Jean Vanier Maverick has held a history of athletic excellence, which continues today. The school was well represented with the colours of red, black, silver and compete in the TDCAA locally and OFSAA provincially. So far, Vanier Mavericks compete in basketball, volleyball, soccer, flag football, rugby, cross country, track and field, badminton, and indoor soccer. It notably previously competed in ice hockey and curling.

The goal of the program is success through participation. The school's Student-Athletes succeed through:

Skill development and teamwork
Recognizing and respecting the skills of their opponents
Competing with tireless effort and with the highest level of integrity
Combining academic excellence with sports
Displaying Christian values that will allow to be leaders of tomorrow

Technology
Continuing with the broadbased technology, Jean Vanier offers a unique blend of courses not found in any other schools such as CITI Motive (Automotive Class) - Dual High School / College Credits, Communications Technology, Partnership with Apple Inc., Yearbook (Desktop Publishing), Photography, among others.

The Communications Technology program began in 2000 under the leadership of Thomas Gilmor and Roy Ilulani with 60 students and has since gone to 250.

"In the service of the community"
In today's world, the students practice an active, faith life through service to the community. The education component is learned through religion classes, regular school practices and through special initiatives such as their affiliation with Development and Peace. Their support with the community through activities such as:

Thanksgiving food drive for the Good Shepherd Refuge,
Christmas Baskets for families through St. Vincent de Paul Society,
Fair Trade Coffee Sales,
The Best Buddies Program

The school has donated volunteer time, food and money to organizations such as: Development and Peace, Nelson Mandela Children's Fund (Canada), Share Life – Covenant House, Inner City Angels, Raising the Roof, Help a Family Fundraiser (a school and orphanage in Puerto Plata, Dominican Republic), St. John the Compassionate Mission, Mothers Against Drunk Driving (MADD), The Royal Canadian Legion Poppy Day Sales, The Louise Russo Fund, Right to Life, and L'Arche Daybreak (Richmond Hill, ON).

Student life
Beyond the classrooms, the Student Advisory Council organizes certain events to show school spirit such as Pep Rally, Fearfest, Semi-Formal, 12 Days of Christmas, Winter Activity Day, School Dance, 30 Hour Famine, SAC Gives Back, and Dress Down Day. In addition to SAC, there are certain organizations and clubs run and operated like Social Justice, History, Maverick Athletic Council, Anime, Chess, Mathematics, Best Buddies, Improv, School Plays, Drumline, and many others.

The Student Advisory Council is currently moderated by the school's teachers Melissa Avecillas (English), Destiny-Lynn Barbitta (Guidance) and Andrea Sisca (Teacher/Librarian).

School media

Yearbooks
Over the years, Jean Vanier has publish several yearbooks in its 22-year life. Unlike all other high schools who receive yearbooks at the end of the year, the yearbooks are released the next year.

 10th Anniversary (1999–2000)
 Tomorrow Came too Soon (2001–2002)
 "www.jeanvanier.com" (2002–2003)
 FlashBACK (2003–2004)
 15th Anniversary (2004–2005)
 Timeless (2005–2006)
 Growing Together (2006–2007)
 Turning Points (2007–2008)
 Forever Young (2008–2009)
 20th Anniversary: And ya Don't Stop! (2009–2010)
 Word (2010–2011)
 Connections (TTC-style motif) (2011–2012)
 Pieces of Us (Jigsaw puzzle motif) (2012–2013)
 TBD (2013–2014)
 TBD (2014–2015)

Vanier Vision
Vanier Vision is a newsletter that highlights the events happening in Jean Vanier throughout the school year. Published by the school principal and the communication technology teacher, it is distributed to students quarterly upon mailing the report cards in November, February, April, or July. The redesign took place starting in the Spring 2013 issue.

Other publications and media
Vanier Vibe  (Student Podcast - Since taken off the air)
Vanier Vibe: The Revival (Student newscast produced in Communication Technology and broadcast throughout the school - Started Spring 2018)
Maverick Star (formerly Papercut)

Administration

Principals
As of July 2015, only four active principals of Jean Vanier Catholic Secondary School remain employed with the TCDSB.

Vice principals
Bianca Auciello (2008–2010) - now at St. Benedict Catholic School; formerly at Neil McNeil and previously a TCDSB Librarian resource head (2010–2012).
Anne Louise Bannon (2013–present) - formerly a Drama teacher at Marshall McLuhan for 13 years
Alda Bassani (2005–2007) - served as VP at Archbishop Romero (2007–2008); as Principal at Loretto Abbey (2008–2013); formerly a teacher at Notre Dame
Mary Curran (2000–2004) - served for the Durham Catholic District School Board at Archbishop Denis O'Connor in Ajax (2004 as VP and 2009–2010 as Principal) and St. Mary in Pickering as Principal (2005–2009)
Ann Gotfryd (1999–2005) - served at Monsignor Fraser College until retirement in 2007
Gianna Helling (2007–2010) - served as VP at Notre Dame; Currently at the elementary panel as Principal of Sts. Cosmas and Damian Catholic School (2010–2013) and St. Sebastian Catholic School (2013–present)
Michael Monk (2010) - Acting VP; founding principal of Bishop Marrocco/Thomas Merton
Reginald Ramlogan (2011–2016) - formerly a Religion teacher at Loretto College
Raymond Sanborn (2005–2008) - served at Loretto Abbey (2008–2010), Notre Dame (2010–2012); now at Archbishop Romero (2012-present)
Allan Schultz (2010–2013) -  now at Archbishop Romero (2013–present); formerly a Canadian and World Studies teacher at Michael Power/St. Joseph
Kathleen Wong (2010–2011) - now at Neil McNeil; formerly a teacher at St. Joseph Wellesley
Michael Wyslobicky (2004–2005) - served as VP at Bishop Marrocco/Thomas Merton (2005–2010)
Zbigniew Reiter (2016–2017)

Feeder schools
 Our Lady of Fatima Catholic Elementary School
 Precious Blood Catholic Elementary School
 St. Agatha Catholic Elementary School
 St. Albert Catholic Elementary School
 St. Barbara Catholic Elementary School
 St. Boniface Catholic Elementary School
 St. Joachim Catholic Elementary School
 St. Lawrence Catholic Elementary School
 St. Maria Goretti Catholic Elementary School
 St. Martin De Porres Catholic Elementary School
 St. Nicholas Catholic Elementary School
 St. Richard Catholic Elementary School
 St. Rose of Lima Catholic Elementary School
 St. Theresa Shrine Catholic Elementary School
 St. Thomas More Catholic Elementary School
 St. Ursula Catholic Elementary School
 St. Victor Catholic Elementary School

This school also accepts students from Bliss Carman Senior Public School, Cedarbrook Public School, Donwood Park Public School, General Crerar Public School, Ionview Public School, John McCrae Public School, Knob Hill Public School, Robert Service Senior Public School, Tredway-Woodsworth Public School and St. Andrew's Public School. All of the schools are located within the vicinity of Cedarbrae Collegiate Institute, David and Mary Thomson Collegiate Institute, R.H. King Academy and Winston Churchill Collegiate Institute.

Notable alumni
 Vijay Thanigasalam - politician, incumbent MPP for Scarborough—Rouge Park (attended 2003–2007).
 Angela Wong - 2018 Miss Chinese Toronto Pageant Miss Congeniality winner (attended 2008–2012).

See also
List of high schools in Ontario
Scarborough Centre for Alternative Studies
Tabor Park Vocational School
Jean Vanier
L'Arche
Faith and Light

References

,

External links
 St. Joan of Arc Catholic Academy

Toronto Catholic District School Board
High schools in Toronto
Catholic secondary schools in Ontario
Educational institutions established in 1989
Bill 30 schools
WZMH Architects buildings
1989 establishments in Ontario
Education in Scarborough, Toronto
Naming controversies